The Vaitarna River (IAST: Vaitarṇā, pronunciation: [ʋəit̪əɾɳaː]) is a river in Nashik and Palghar district of Maharashtra. The Tansa is its left bank tributary and the Pinjal, Dehraja, and Surya are its right bank tributaries. Upper stretches of the Vaitarna are clean but in lower stretches it is polluted due to untreated industrial and civic waste. The Vaitarna is one of the most polluted rivers in India.

Course
It originates in Sahyadri mountain ranges near Trimbakeshwar. The Vaitarna is just 2 km away from India’s second longest river, the Godavari. Vaitarna has a confluence with the Tanasa just before it enters the Arabian Sea. Jhow and Wadhiv islands lie in its estuary. Arnala Island lies off its mouth. It has three major dams which supply water to Mumbai.

Significance
The Vaitarna supplies much of Mumbai's drinking water. It is the largest river in the Northern Konkan region and drains Maharashtra's whole Palghar district.

Legacy
The , a steamship, was named after the river.

References

Rivers of Maharashtra
Rivers of India